Relli may refer to:
Relli River, in Sikkim, India
Relli people, an ethnic group in eastern India
Relli language, an Indo-Aryan language

See also 
 Conrad Marca-Relli, American artist
 Reli (disambiguation)
 Rely (disambiguation)